Carlo Lievore (10 November 1937 – 9 October 2002) was an Italian javelin thrower.

Biography
He won one medal, at senior level, at the International athletics competitions. He competed in the 1960 Summer Olympics and in the 1964 Summer Olympics. His older brother Giovanni Lievore was also a javelin thrower. He has 42 caps in national team from 1956 to 1971.

World record
Javelin throw: 86.74 m ( Milan, 1 June 1961) - holder til 1 June 1964

Olympic results

National titles
Lievore won the individual national championship six times. His six wins came in the javelin throw in 1957, 1959, 1960, 1961, 1964, and 1969.

See also
 FIDAL Hall of Fame
 Men's javelin world record progression

References

External links
 

1937 births
2002 deaths
Italian male javelin throwers
Olympic athletes of Italy
Athletes (track and field) at the 1960 Summer Olympics
Athletes (track and field) at the 1964 Summer Olympics
Mediterranean Games gold medalists for Italy
Athletes (track and field) at the 1963 Mediterranean Games
Mediterranean Games medalists in athletics